Avenir Club Avignonnais, known simply as Avignon, is a football club based in the city of Avignon, France. The club notably competed in the Division 1 in the 1975–76 season.

History
The club was founded in 1931 as Association Sportive Avignonnaise and played professionally from 1942 until 1948. The club was later renamed Olympique Avignonnais in a merger with Saint-Jean and became professional again in 1965.

In 1975, the team was promoted to Division 1, after winning a playoff match against FC Rouen. However, the 1975–1976 season was disastrous, as the club finished bottom with 20 Points, 7 victories, 6 draws, 25 defeats, with 30 goals scored and 80 goals conceded. The club was relegated from Division 2 in 1976 and had to forgo its professional status in 1981 due to financial problems.

The club found itself in the fourth division in 1983–1984, but bounced back to Division 2 after successive promotions from 1989 to 1991. In 1992, the club was renamed Club Olympique Avignonnais after a merger with Sporting Club Avignonais. Relegation to the sixth division (Division d'honneur) followed in 1994. The club was renamed Avignon Foot 84 in 2003.

Managerial history
Source:

Dautheribes
Huot
Roger Cabanis: 1945–1948
Mokhtar Arribi: 1957–1958
Roger Vandooren: 1960–1965
Léon Glovacki: 1965 – April 1968
Robert Siatka: April 1968 – 1970
Louis Dupal: 1970–1971
Louis Hon: 1971–1972
Marc Bourrier: 1972–1976
Albert Batteux: 1976–1977
Jacques Bonnet: 1977–1979
Yves Sicard: 1979–1983
Robert Pintenat: 1983–1986
André Moulon: 1986–1988
René Exbrayat: 1988–1991
Georges Korac: 1993–1996
Charles Decorzent: 2000–2002
Franck Lucchesi: 2003–2005
Christophe Chaintreuil: 2005–

References

External links
 Official site

 
Association football clubs established in 1931
Sport in Avignon
1931 establishments in France
Football clubs in Provence-Alpes-Côte d'Azur
Ligue 1 clubs